King Oil is a board game by Scott Patton, created in 1974 and now long out-of-print. The game requires players to drill for oil on a three-dimensional board, acquiring property and wealth.

The board is "randomized" using three rotating discs, hidden inside the plastic frame of the game and containing varying hole locations; one player turns at least one of the discs before play begins. There are 1,728 (12³, or 12x12x12) permutations of oil wells.
The rotating discs determine the depth of the wells that players will drill, with four possibilities:
shallow depth (the "driller" passes through no holes, showing all three colors)
medium depth (passes through one hole, showing two colors)
deep depth (passes through two holes, showing one color)
dry hole (passes through all three holes, showing no colors)

At least two color schemes are used for the driller (depending on the edition), using red, yellow, and blue, in either order.

A player pays $2,000, $4,000, or $6,000 to drill each well, depending on depth (the deeper the depth the more it costs; the last amount also applies to "dry" holes).

Before drilling, players must buy property. (Each player choose one of 18 properties on the board to begin the game.) Pipelines can be bought once there are four producing oil wells on a property. The pipelines span into adjacent properties, enabling the pipeline owner to siphon royalties from the adjacent property owner every turn. This game mechanic accelerates bankruptcy of opposing players, keeping total playing time within reasonable limits.

The goal of the game is to push all opponents into bankruptcy; the last remaining player is the winner. The game can also end if the bank runs out of money; in this case, the remaining players total up their assets and the player with the highest net worth is the winner.

The game is played by two to four players. The game includes one playing surface, one oil well Rig "driller", 84 derricks (21 per color), 128 well caps (32 per color), 24 tool sheds (6 per color), 36 pipelines (9 per color), (Each of these items are in four different colors: Red, Blue, White, Yellow), 1 money pack (50 of each bill: $500 (Yellow color), $1000 (Pink color), $5000 (Green color), and $10,000 (Blue color) and 32 "King Oil"* turn cards (some editions of the game label the turn cards "Wildcat").

Wildcat Cards
The 32 Wildcat Cards come in three types - Fire Damage, Oil Depletion, and Production. The distribution is as follows:
2 Fire Damage Cards: The player must cap some of their wells depending on the total number of wells owned.
5 Oil Depletion Cards: The player receives a $500 oil depletion allowance regardless of the number of wells owned. The player may drill one well and no property is available for purchase.
25 Production Cards: The card specifies three things: how much money is earned for each well owned – $500, $1000, $2000, $3000, or $4000; how many wells the player is allowed to drill - ranging from one to four; and finally, whether or not a property is available for purchase - 7 of the production cards have a property for sale.
The following table shows the distribution of production cards. The parenthesized number indicates how many of the production cards of a given type have a property available for sale.

Properties
The board has 18 properties ranging in price from $8000 to $12000. The price of a property is $1000 per drilling site.

External links
King Oil rules at Hasbro.com (PDF)

Board games introduced in 1974
Economic simulation board games
Milton Bradley Company games